Cleiton Schwengber (born 19 August 1997), simply known as Cleiton, is a Brazilian footballer who plays as a goalkeeper for Red Bull Bragantino.

International career
Cleiton represented Brazil at the 2017 South American U-20 Championship and the 2020 CONMEBOL Pre-Olympic Tournament, being runner-up in the latter and securing a spot at the 2020 Olympics.

Career statistics

Club

References

External links

1997 births
Living people
Sportspeople from Santa Catarina (state)
Brazilian footballers
Brazil youth international footballers
Brazil under-20 international footballers
Association football goalkeepers
Campeonato Brasileiro Série A players
Clube Atlético Mineiro players
Red Bull Bragantino players